Andreas Waschburger (born 6 January 1987 in Saarbrücken) is a German professional swimmer, specialising in Open water swimming. He competed at the 2012 Summer Olympics finishing 8th in the 10 km open water marathon.

References

External links 
 
 

German male swimmers
1987 births
Living people
Olympic swimmers of Germany
Swimmers at the 2012 Summer Olympics
Sportspeople from Saarbrücken
Universiade bronze medalists for Germany
Universiade medalists in swimming
Male long-distance swimmers
Medalists at the 2013 Summer Universiade
20th-century German people
21st-century German people